Matt Rambo (born July 25, 1994) is a professional lacrosse attackman for the Whipsnakes Lacrosse Club of the Premier Lacrosse League and the Philadelphia Wings of the National Lacrosse League from Glenside, Pennsylvania. He played college lacrosse at Maryland.

College career
Rambo spent four years at the University of Maryland, where he only missed one start his entire career, and reached the final four every year and the championship game in his final three years.

Freshman year
In Rambo's first game at Maryland, he scored four goals against the Mount St. Mary's Mountaineers. He ended the season with 30 goals and six assists.

Sophomore year
As a sophomore, Rambo played in the only game that he didn't not start in his entire college lacrosse career. He became the first Maryland player to score 40 goals in a season since Joe Walters in 2004. He also made First Team All Big Ten.

Junior year
Rambo became the first player in Maryland history to have 40 goals and 30 assists in one season after ending the year with 43 goals and 32 assists. These 75 points are third all-time in Maryland history. He helped Maryland win the Big Ten tournament and won Big Ten Tournament MVP and USILA All-American. Maryland lost in the 2016 NCAA Division I Men's Lacrosse Championship in a game that is considered a classic.

Senior year
Rambo started the season with 19 points in the first three games, which is the most by a Maryland player in a three-game span since Mike Mollot. In the final game of the season, on April 29, against Johns Hopkins, Rambo scored six points in the first 18 minutes, which broke the Maryland all-time points record. Rambo helped lead Maryland to their first NCAA Men's Lacrosse Championship in 42 years.  Rambo also won the Tewaaraton Award, the highest award for a college lacrosse player. He was the first player in Maryland history to win the award.

Professional career

MLL career
Rambo was drafted third overall in the 2017 Major League Lacrosse draft by the Charlotte Hounds. He had nine goals and six assists in six games for the Hounds that year.

NLL career
Rambo was drafted in the fifth round of the NLL draft by the New England Black Wolves, but decided to sit out the season and travel around doing clinics and camps instead of playing in the NLL. The next year, Rambo returned home to Pennsylvania for the start of his box lacrosse career after being selected 11th overall in the 2018 National Lacrosse League expansion draft to play for the Philadelphia Wings.

Rambo scored 26 goals and had 30 assists in 17 games in his first season in the NLL.

PLL career
In 2018, Matt Rambo was announced as a member of Whipsnakes Lacrosse Club in the inaugural season of Paul Rabil’s new Premier Lacrosse League. He was selected to the league's first All Star game in 2019, where he was a captain. Rambo led the league in points and assists during the 2019 regular season. He was named league MVP for the 2019 season during the awards show on Thursday, September 19.

On Saturday, September 21, Rambo scored both the game-tying goal with under a minute left and the sudden-victory game-winner in overtime in the PLL championship game against the Redwoods. He was named MVP of the game.

Rambo made first team all-pro for the 2019 PLL season.

International career 
Rambo represented the United States at the 2019 World Indoor Lacrosse Championship, where he recorded nine points in four games as the US won the bronze medal.

Personal life 
He enjoys playing Golf at Marsh Landing Country Club and Sawgrass Country Club in Ponte Vedra Beach, FL near his home. He also plays in a competitive Pickleball group with Best Selling Author, Jon Gordon, Former PLL and MLL lacrosse star, Chris Bocklet, and Entrepreneur/Philanthropist, Scott Owen. He is the headline athlete for the electric bike company, TikiBikes.

NCAA career statistics 

Source:

MLL career statistics

NLL career statistics

PLL career statistics 

Source:

References

Maryland Terrapins men's lacrosse players
Lacrosse players from Pennsylvania
Living people
Premier Lacrosse League players
1994 births
Philadelphia Wings players
Charlotte Hounds players
People from Cheltenham, Pennsylvania
Sportspeople from Montgomery County, Pennsylvania